Rudi Birkenstock (born 8 November 1963) is a South African cricket umpire. He has stood in matches in the 2016–17 Sunfoil 3-Day Cup and the 2016–17 CSA Provincial One-Day Challenge tournaments. His son, Karl, plays first-class cricket for Namibia.

References

External links
 

1963 births
Living people
South African cricket umpires
Sportspeople from Johannesburg